The Battle of Berlengas was fought in 1666 during the Portuguese Restoration War, between the Portuguese defenders of the Fort São João Baptista and a Spanish fleet commanded by Diego de Ibarra. The fleet, which had destroyed Portuguese fisheries, bombarded towns and cut off supplies in one month as part of its onslaught, proceeded to storm the fort on the Berlengas. The fort was destroyed and the entire garrison were captured.

After the attack the repair of the fort was initiated, being concluded in 1678 by João de Mascarenhas, 1st Marquess of Fronteira.

Notes

References
 Darwin Porter, Danforth Prince, Frommer's Portugal (2010) 
 Abigail Hole, Charlotte Beech, Portugal (2005) 
 Fernández Duro, Cesáreo: Armada española desde la unión de los reinos de Castilla y de León, Vol.5. Est. tipográfico "Sucesores de Rivadeneyra", (1899)
 Brown, Rawdon & Cavendish, George: Calendar of state papers and manuscripts relating, to English affairs, existing in the archives and collections of Venice: and in other libraries of northern Italy, Vol.35. H.M. Stationery office, 1935

Berlengas 
Berlengas 
the Berlengas 1666|Berlengas 
1666 in Portugal
the Berlengas 1666
Berlengas